Himat may refer to:
Bradley BA-300 Himat, a proposed American aircraft design
Rockwell HiMAT, an experimental American aircraft design